Marat Nailyevich Khayrullin (born 26 April 1984) is a Russian-born Kazakh former football attacking midfielder/forward.

Career

Club
Khayrullin previously played for FC Rubin Kazan's B team.

On 30 September 2016, Khayrullin had his contract with FC Okzhetpes terminated by mutual consent.

Career statistics

International

Statistics accurate as of match played 7 June 2014

Honours
Aktobe
Kazakhstan Premier League (4): 2007, 2008, 2009, 2013
Kazakhstan Cup (1): 2008
Kazakhstan Super Cup (2): 2008, 2014

References

External links

1984 births
Living people
Association football midfielders
Russian footballers
Kazakhstani footballers
Kazakhstani expatriate footballers
Expatriate footballers in Russia
Kazakhstan international footballers
Russian First League players
Russian Second League players
Kazakhstan Premier League players
Russian expatriate sportspeople in Kazakhstan
FC Rubin Kazan players
FC Aktobe players
FC Volga Nizhny Novgorod players
FC Okzhetpes players
FC Atyrau players
FC Kaisar players